Terellia whitei is a species of tephritid or fruit flies in the genus Terellia of the family Tephritidae.

Distribution
Turkmenistan, Kazakhstan, Iran.

References

Tephritinae
Insects described in 2013
Diptera of Asia